Conasprella aculeiformis, common name the spindle cone, is a species of sea snail, a marine gastropod mollusk in the family Conidae, the cone snails and their allies.

Like all species within the genus Conasprella, these snails are predatory and venomous. They are capable of "stinging" humans, therefore live ones should be handled carefully or not at all.

Description
The narrow shell has an elevated spire. The length of the shell varies between 27 mm and 54 mm. It is encircled with equidistant punctate grooves, and flat interspaces. The color of the shell is white, with light chestnut spots and two interrupted broad bands of chestnut cloudings.

Distribution
This marine species occurs in the Red Sea, the Persian Gulf; off Southeast India, the Philippines and off Southern Indonesia

References

 Filmer R.M. (2001). A Catalogue of Nomenclature and Taxonomy in the Living Conidae 1758 – 1998. Backhuys Publishers, Leiden. 388pp.
 Tucker J.K. (2009). Recent cone species database. September 4, 2009 Edition
 Tucker J.K. & Tenorio M.J. (2009) Systematic classification of Recent and fossil conoidean gastropods. Hackenheim: Conchbooks. 296 pp
  Puillandre N., Duda T.F., Meyer C., Olivera B.M. & Bouchet P. (2015). One, four or 100 genera? A new classification of the cone snails. Journal of Molluscan Studies. 81: 1–23

External links
 The Conus Biodiversity website
 Cone Shells – Knights of the Sea
 

aculeiformis
Gastropods described in 1844